Gérard Jaffrès (born 15 December 1956 in Saint-Pol-de-Léon, Finistère) is a French singer, writer and performer.

He started playing the guitar at the age of 15, playing mostly folk repertoire (Alan Stivell, Tri Yann...) and rock music (Deep Purple, Led Zeppelin...).

In 1973, he joined Burt Blanca's band. He stayed with it for 11 years as a bass player. The same year, he moved to Belgium, his current home.

Jaffrès started a solo career in 1985, recording ten discs with Gramophone records. He has published a new album every two years since 1991.

Jaffrès' music is a blend of Celtic music and rock'n'roll/folk which he uses to depict the landscape of Brittany and tell legends from the area of Leon (North Finistère). His texts sometimes mix Breton and French.

Discography
 Capitaine de Galère, 1991
 Les Soldats de Pierre, 1993
Kérichen 72, 1995
Les Années Baluches, 1997
Au Creux de ma Terre, 1999
Le Fou de Bassan, 2001
Viens dans ma maison, 2003
Le Beau Voyage, 2005
Mon Pays t'attend, 2007
Nos Premières Années, 2008
Gérard Jaffrès En Public, 2010 (Live CD DVD)
Mystérieuses Landes, 2012
Je sais d'où je viens, 2016
2020, 2020

References

External links

 Gérard Jaffrès official web site 
 Gerard Jaffrès weblink 

1956 births
French male singers
French composers
French male composers
Celtic rock music
Breton musicians
People from Finistère
French rock singers
Living people